John Benjamin Dancer (8 October 1812 – 24 November 1887) was a British scientific instrument maker and inventor of microphotography. He also pioneered stereography.

Life 
By 1835, he controlled his father's instrument making business in Liverpool. He was responsible for various inventions, but did not patent many of his ideas. In 1856, he invented the stereoscopic camera (GB patent 2064/1856). He died at the age of 75 and was buried at Brooklands Cemetery, Sale, Greater Manchester.

Dancer improved the Daniell cell by introducing the porous pot cell, which he invented in 1838. He was a leading inventor and practitioner in the emerging field of microphotography, work he began shortly after the Daguerreotype process was first announced in 1839.  His novel uses of microphotography, such as "the reduction of the 680-word tablet erected in memory of the electrician William Sturgeon to a positive one-sixteenth of an inch in diameter", attracted much public attention. Dancer was remembered as a person very willing to share his expertise with others.  For example, he assisted the physicist James Prescott Joule with the development of scientific instruments such as an apparatus for measuring the internal capacity of the bore of thermometer tubes, a tangent galvanometer, and other devices useful in Joule's research. A substantial collection of Dancer's papers, photographs, and apparatus is held by the Ransom Center at the University of Texas.

In 1842 Dancer took a daguerreotype from the top of the Royal Exchange which is the earliest known photograph showing part of Manchester.

References

External articles and references
John Benjamin Dancer, Museum of Science & Industry, Manchester
John Benjamin Dancer Manchester Microscopical & Natural History Society.

British scientific instrument makers
1812 births
1887 deaths
People associated with electricity
Businesspeople from Liverpool
19th-century English businesspeople